Ilya Livykou or Ilia Livykou (1919 in Heraklio – 6 September 2002 in Athens, Greece) was a Greek actress, a partner with Vassilis Logothetidis.

Her real name was Amalia Hatzaki or Hadjaki (Αμαλία Χατζάκη), later Kozyri (Κοζύρη).  She began her education in javelin throwing and studied law in Athens.  She brought her tests and marked excellently at the Dramatic School of the Royal Theatre.  Her first part was at the theatre that she done in 1947
 and from 1948 until 1960, played with Logothetidis.  In film, she appeared in her first time in The Germans are Coming by Alekos Sakellarios (1948).  She played in many movies.  She left the theatre in 1985 and suffered her worst blow in 1985 when her daughter Eva (one of the three children of her first husband Agissilaos Kozyris) suffered brain tumor and died in Kypseli.  She is buried in Kaisariani next to her loving daughter.

Characteristic irregular stage

In the movie Oute gata oute zimia
Lalakis Makrykostas: "Πρόσεξε καλά γιατί εγώ δεν τρώω άχυρα" (Prosexe kala giati ego den troo achyra)
Ka Makrykosta: "Το βρίσκω πολύ φυσικό. Άχυρα τρώνε μόνο τ'άλογα." (To vrisko poly fysiko.  Achyra trone mono 't'aloga)

Filmography

Television
Aporritos fakelos 27 (1972)

References

External links

1919 births
2002 deaths
Greek stage actresses
Greek film actresses
People from Heraklion
Actresses from Crete